The Ocean World of Jacques Cousteau by Jacques Cousteau is an encyclopedia in 21 volumes, that forms an encyclopedia of marine life.

It was published between 1973 and 1978.

List of books 
 Oasis in Space
 The Act of Life
 Quest for Food
 Window in the Sea
 The Art of Motion
 Attack and Defense
 Invisible Messages
 Instinct and Intelligence
 Pharaohs of the Sea
 Mammals in the Sea
 Provinces of the Sea
 Man Re-Enters Sea
 A Sea of Legends
 Adventure of Life
 Outer and Inner Space
 The Whitecaps
 Riches of the Sea
 Challenges of the Sea
 The Sea in Danger
 Guide to the Sea and Index
 Calypso

References 

Encyclopedias of science
1970s books
Jacques Cousteau